William T. O'Donnell Jr. (June 4, 1926 – October 29, 1982) was an American sportscaster.

Life and career
Born in Manhattan and raised in The Bronx, O'Donnell attended Fordham Preparatory School and Fordham University. After serving in the Marines during World War II, he completed his education at Mohawk Valley Community College, then began his sportscasting career in Syracuse, calling Syracuse Chiefs minor-league baseball and Syracuse University football and basketball. He also worked as the nightly sportscaster for WSYR for many years.

The Baltimore Orioles hired O'Donnell in 1966, and he paired with Chuck Thompson to call their games on WJZ-TV (1966–1977), WBAL-AM (1966–1978), and WFBR-AM with fellow broadcaster Tom Marr from 1979 until health reasons forced him to step down early in the 1982 season.  O'Donnell also contributed to national coverage of the team's appearances in the 1969 World Series on NBC Television and the 1971 World Series on NBC Radio.

In addition to the Orioles, O'Donnell called Baltimore Colts radio from 1966 to 1968, as well as college football for ABC, regional MLB and NFL games for NBC, and college basketball for TVS Television Network.

O'Donnell died at age 56 of cancer at Johns Hopkins Hospital on October 29, 1982. He was posthumously given the Herb Armstrong Award by the Baltimore Orioles Hall of Fame in 2007.

References

1926 births
1982 deaths
American Football League announcers
United States Marine Corps personnel of World War II
American radio sports announcers
American television sports announcers
Baltimore Colts announcers
Baltimore Orioles announcers
College basketball announcers in the United States
College football announcers
Deaths from cancer in Maryland
Fordham University alumni
Major League Baseball broadcasters
Minor League Baseball broadcasters
National Basketball Association broadcasters
National Football League announcers
Sportspeople from Baltimore
Sportspeople from the Bronx
Syracuse Orange football announcers
Syracuse Orange men's basketball announcers
United States Marines
Fordham Preparatory School alumni